Another Man's Wife and a Husband Under the Bed is a 1984 Soviet TV comedy film directed by Vitaly Melnikov. It is based on the 1848 story by Fyodor Dostoevsky of the same name.

Plot 
The film is a vaudevillian story about a solid, venerable, jealous husband (Oleg Tabakov) searching for his frivolous wife (Marina Shimanskaya) winds up in someone else's apartment and finds himself under the bed of an unknown woman (Marina Neyolova) together with an unknown man (Stanislav Sadalsky) who is also there by accident.

Cast

Crew

Filming 
According to Vitaly Melnikov, everyone had fun making the movie. The only difficulty was getting from under the antique bed which could've collapsed anytime, so Stanislav Sadalsky had to stay down there. He was then joined by Oleg Tabakov, and during pauses both of them simply fell asleep. Yuri Bogatyryov had only one free day, so he invented his costume and changed closes on the way from Moscow to Leningrad, thus upon arrival everyone witnessed a 19th-century nobleman casually walking out of a Soviet train.

Critics 
Writer Yevgeni Popov called the original story "an amusingly talented, funny, light, playful thing" written by a "then-lad Dostoevsky", and noted that a significant part of future absurdists such as Daniil Kharms or Nikolay Oleynikov owed him. Popov also recommended to watch the movie, highlighting the acting and Oleg Yefremov's work in particular. "Usually such a severe man flexing his jaw muscles, here he appears as an elderly relaxed gentleman".

References

External links 
 
 Another Man’s Wife and a Husband Under the Bed at the National Film Register, Ministry of Culture of Russia
 Full movie at the official Lenfilm YouTube channel (with English subtitles)
 Another Man’s Wife and a Husband Under the Bed at the Cyril and Methodius Online Encyclopedia (in Russian)
 Another Man’s Wife and a Husband Under the Bed at Russia-K (in Russian)

1984 films
Films based on short fiction
Films based on works by Fyodor Dostoyevsky
Russian comedy films
Vaudeville
1984 comedy films
1980s Russian-language films